Kapka Tash Lake is a rock-dammed lake in Toktogul District of Jalal-Abad Province of Kyrgyzstan. It is located at the altitude of 2303 m in riverbed of Kara-Suu, left tributary of Naryn River.

References 

Lakes of Kyrgyzstan
Mountain lakes